Natural Hygienists (also called orthopaths) are people who practice orthopathy. The following people are recognized as notable Natural Hygienists, either currently or historically.

A
Harriet N. Austin

B
Sanford Bennett
Paul Bragg

C
Paul Carton

D
Emmet Densmore
Arnold DeVries
H. Jay Dinshah
Susanna Way Dodds

E
Arnold Ehret

G
Jesse Mercer Gehman
Symon Gould
Sylvester Graham

H
Annie Riley Hale
Linda Hazzard

J
James Caleb Jackson
Isaac Jennings
James Hervey Johnson

K

Ben Klassen
Henry Valentine Knaggs

M
Frank McCoy
Eli Peck Miller

N
Mary Gove Nichols

O
Felix Leopold Oswald

P
Charles Edward Page
Edward Earle Purinton

S
Herbert M. Shelton 
Joel Shew 
Walter Siegmeister
Edmund Bordeaux Szekely

T
George H. Taylor
John Henry Tilden
Russell Thacher Trall

W

Robert Walter
George S. Weger

References

orthopathy
Orthopathy